Marcel Van de Perre (1908 – 1968) was a Belgian sculptor. His work was part of the sculpture event in the art competition at the 1936 Summer Olympics.

References

1908 births
1968 deaths
20th-century Belgian sculptors
20th-century male artists
Olympic competitors in art competitions
Artists from Ghent